Union of Pioneers of Yugoslavia ((ZPJ)) also known as Tito's Pioneers was the pioneer movement of the Socialist Federal Republic of Yugoslavia. Its members, basically all children of age seven and older, attended an annual ceremony and wore uniforms.

The uniforms consisted of red scarves as well as navy blue hats called Titovka. These hats were sometimes white, and bore a red star on the front. A white shirt was often worn with the Pioneer scarf (marama) and the Titovka, although this varied depending on which part of Yugoslavia the particular pioneer was from. Boys often wore navy blue shorts or pants, and girls wore skirts in the same colour, along with white stockings and black shoes. On special occasions, such as a visit from Josip Broz Tito, Pioniri sometimes wore traditional costumes from their native regions of Yugoslavia.

The organization was founded on December 27, 1942. It was a substructure within the League of Communist Youth and, after 1948, the League of Socialist Youth. It published Male novine. The organization was divided into younger pioneers (7–11 years) and older pioneers (11–15 years).

Unlike other pioneer movements the full military salute was used, honoring the children and youth who fought as part of the Yugoslav Partisans of the Second World War.

Induction and pledge 

Typically, the induction ceremony took place in school for children aged 7 in the autumn of their first year in school, as part of the Republic Day celebrations. Following the ceremony, the children would be given a red Pioneer Booklet, similar to a communist party membership booklet. The booklet was signed by the "President of the Pioneer Committee", a senior pioneer and served as evidence of membership. The youngest generation that undertook it was born in 1982, which occurred during the 1989–1990 school year. The text of Yugoslav Pioneer pledge (pionirska zakletva) may have varied slightly from one school to another.  Reconstructed from imperfect recollections, in Serbo-Croatian (Ekavian and Ijekavian pronunciations):
Danas, kada postajem pionir,
dajem časnu pionirsku riječ/reč
da ću marljivo učiti i raditi,
poštovati roditelje i starije,
i biti vjeran/veran i iskren drug,
koji drži datu riječ/reč,
da ću voljeti/voleti našu domovinu,
samoupravnu Socijalističku Federativnu Republiku Jugoslaviju,
da ću razvijati bratstvo i jedinstvo
i ideje za koje se borio drug Tito,
da ću cijeniti/ceniti sve ljude svijeta/sveta koji žele slobodu i mir!

In Slovene:
Danes, ko postajam pionir
dajem častno pionirsko besedo
da se bom pridno učil in delal,
spoštoval starše in učitelje,
da bom zvest in iskren tovariš,
ki drži svojo obljubo,
da se bom ravnal po zgledu najboljših pionirjev,
da bom spoštoval slavna dejanja partizanov,
in napredne ljudi sveta,
ki žele svobodo in mir,
da bom ljubil svojo domovino
samoupravno Socialistično Federativno Republiko Jugoslavijo,
njene bratske narode in narodnosti
in gradil novo življenje, polno sreče in radosti.

In English:
Today, as I become a Pioneer,
I give my Pioneer's word of honour -
That I shall study and work diligently,
respect parents and my seniors,
and be a loyal and honest comrade/friend.
That I shall love our homeland, self-managed
Socialist Federal Republic of Yugoslavia.
That I shall spread brotherhood and unity
and the principles for which comrade Tito fought.
And that I shall value all peoples of the world who respect freedom and peace!

Across the former-Yugoslav territory (Slovenia, Croatia, Bosnia and Herzegovina, Serbia, Montenegro, North Macedonia), many remember their days as Pioneers, and as a result, it is not uncommon to hear people refer to themselves as "Titov(a) pionir(ka)", meaning "Tito's Pioneer".

Function 
The social function of becoming a pioneer in communist countries was similar to that of First Communion in Roman Catholic Church. In both cases, a child at the critical age of around seven is initiated as a member of a group within which the individuals share certain values and culture. This early initiation increases the likelihood that, once the child becomes an adult, they will identify with the group.

Children were taught to be responsible and respectful, were asked to study hard and were considered the future generations of the nation.

See also 

Pioneer Movement
League of Socialist Youth of Yugoslavia
Young Pioneer organization of the Soviet Union
Young Pioneer camp

References 

League of Communists of Yugoslavia
Youth organizations established in 1942
Organizations disestablished in 1992
Pioneer movement
Youth organizations based in Yugoslavia
Child-related organizations in Serbia
1942 establishments in Yugoslavia
1992 disestablishments in Yugoslavia